South Carolina Highway 215 (SC 215) is a  primary state highway in the U.S. state of South Carolina. It serves as an alternate route to Union from either Columbia or Spartanburg.

Route description

History

It was established in 1928 as a renumbering of SC 121 and SC 161. It originally traveled from U.S. Route 78 (US 78) in Aiken, northeast through Wagener, Pelion, Edmund, and West Columbia. Through Columbia, in a concurrency with US 1/US 21/SC 2, it heads northwest through Jenkinsville, Carlisle, ending at US 176/SC 92 in Union.

In 1939, the entire route was paved.  In 1948, SC 215 was rerouted to approach Union from the south, its old route through Monarch Mill being replaced by SC 92 (today SC 49-SC 215 Connector).  In 1949, SC 215 was extended north to SC 56, in Pauline; a year later, it was extended north again to US 221 in Roebuck.

By 1958, SC 215 was rerouted in Columbia along Assembly Street to Blossom Street before heading west across the Saluda River in concurrency with US 21/US 176/US 321. By 1964, SC 215 was extended north from Roebuck to its current northern terminus at SC 295/SC 296 in Spartanburg; it replaced SC 295, and brought SC 215 to its longest routing.

Between 1974-77, SC 215 south of Eau Claire, in Columbia, was removed.  The old alignment between Aiken to Cayce became SC 302, while in Columbia US 21/US 321 remained.

Major intersections

Union connector route

South Carolina Highway 215 Connector (SC 215 Conn.) is a brief  stub of Pinckney Street, between the SC 215 mainline and SC 18. It serves as a turn-off onto SC 18, from SC 215, without taking the right turn at the intersection immediately afterwards; as a hidden designation, signage only identifies it as SC 18 north (no south).

See also

References

External links

 
 Mapmikey's South Carolina Highways Page: SC 215
 Mapmikey's South Carolina Highways Page: Former SC 215 Alternate

215
Transportation in Richland County, South Carolina
Transportation in Fairfield County, South Carolina
Transportation in Chester County, South Carolina
Transportation in Union County, South Carolina
Transportation in Spartanburg County, South Carolina
Transportation in Columbia, South Carolina